Gay, Black and Married is a 2005 studio album by industrial disco band My Life with the Thrill Kill Kult. The band describes it as an homage to the 1970s disco era.

Recording
Gay, Black and Married was recorded at The Cave and mixed at Starlust Studios, Los Angeles. It was mastered at The Boiler Room, Chicago.

Release
Gay, Black and Married was the first album to have its initial release on Rykodisc, the label that handles their reissues. It was released in the UK in a plastic sleeve with an insert.

Track listing

Credits
 Arranged By – LaZar
 Art Direction – Coco St. Clair
 Backing Vocals – The Birds Of Paradise, Gabriella LaBlanca
 Concept By – Enzo Santiago, Skye d'Angelo
 Design – House Of Monique
 Directed By – Groovie Mann
 Engineer – Bruno Zorelli
 Flute – Varushka
 Handclaps [Magic] – Pierre, Suki
 Keyboards [Additional] – Sergio Z.
 Mastered By – Collin Jordan
 Mixed by – Buzz McCoy, Enzo Santiago
 Producer – Buzz McCoy
 Programmed by – Xavier Dolce
 Strings – Fredrico Villani
 Tenor saxophone – Max Baxter
 Written by – Santiago (tracks: 2 to 11), d'Angelo (tracks: 2, 3, 9), Peter Brown, Robert Rans (track 1)

References

External links
 

2005 albums
My Life with the Thrill Kill Kult albums